Unibet Arena (named Saku Suurhall until 31 December 2022) is a multi-purpose indoor arena in the Haabersti subdistrict of the Estonian capital, Tallinn. Opened in November 2001, it is the largest multi-purpose hall in the country with around 7,200 seats but can hold up to 10,000 people.

It generally hosts basketball games, as well as sport competitions, trade fairs, corporate events and concerts. The name sponsor for the arena is the Swedish sports betting company Unibet and the venue is owned by businessman Marcel Vichmann via his company Best Idea OÜ.

History

Initial plans for the arena were announced in August 1999. Unibet Arena opened in November 2001. Since 2002, the arena is a member of the European Arenas Association (EAA).

A total of 13,220 m² spread over four floors. Every year around 300 events take place in the hall, of which about 70 are major events. It accommodates up to 10,000 spectators, of which 7,200 are seated. The first event in the hall was the Irish dance show Lord of the Dance.

Past events
Some of the notable events, which took place in the arena are:

Music
 Eurovision Song Contest 2002
 Pirate Station Future (November 22, 2008) & Immortal (December 18, 2009)
 Eesti Laul final (2016–2022)

Sports
Tallinn International Horse Show (2002–present)
Simpel Session (2004–present)
2002 and 2008 European Karate Championships
2010 European Figure Skating Championships
2013 European Cadet Judo Championships
2013 FIBA Europe Under-20 Championship
2015 Toyota Four Nations Cup
2021 Men's European Volleyball Championship (Pool D matches)

Concerts

Alice Cooper
Alice in Chains
Avril Lavigne
Backstreet Boys
Bastille
Bob Dylan
Bring Me the Horizon
Bryan Adams
Cascada
Chase & Status
Chris Rea
Cirque du Soleil
Darren Hayes
Deep Purple
Def Leppard
Demis Roussos
Depeche Mode
Disturbed
Ed Sheeran
Elton John
Enrique Iglesias
Flyleaf
Foreigner
Good Charlotte
Gregorian
Hurts
Imagine Dragons
Irina Allegrova
Iron Maiden
James Blunt
Jamiroquai
Joe Cocker
Judas Priest
Korn
Kraftwerk
Kylie Minogue
Lenny Kravitz
Limp Bizkit
Lordi
Mamma Mia!
Mariah Carey
Marilyn Manson
Mark Knopfler
Massive Attack
Metallica
Michael Bublé
Muse
Nazareth
Nelly
Nero
Nightwish
OneRepublic
Ozzy Osbourne
Patricia Kaas
Paul van Dyk
Pet Shop Boys
Phil Collins
P!nk
Placebo
Plácido Domingo
Rammstein
R.E.M.
Ray Charles
REO Speedwagon
Rihanna
Roxette
Ruslana
Sade
Sarah Brightman
Scorpions
Seal
Simple Minds
Simply Red
Smokie
Sting
Styx
Suzi Quatro
t.A.T.u.
The Bravery
The Prodigy
The Sweet
Thirty Seconds To Mars
Tiësto
Tom Jones
Toto Cutugno
Underworld
Vanessa-Mae
Vanilla Ninja
Vaya Con Dios
Whitesnake
Yes

See also
List of indoor arenas in Estonia

References

External links
 
  

Music venues in Estonia
Music venues completed in 2001
Sports venues completed in 2001
2001 establishments in Estonia
Sports venues in Estonia
Basketball venues in Estonia
Indoor arenas in Estonia
Indoor ice hockey venues in Estonia
Sports venues in Tallinn